David Fernández may refer to:

 David Fernández (table tennis), table tennis player from Puerto Rico
 David Fernández Borbalán (born 1973), Spanish football referee
 David Fernández (footballer, born 1976), Spanish retired footballer
 David Fernández (footballer, born 1985), Spanish footballer
 David Fernández (judoka) (born 1973), Costa Rican judoka
 David Fernández Ortiz  (born 1970), plays Spanish comedic character Rodolfo Chikilicuatre
 David Fernández Revoredo (1954–1996), pilot of Aeroperú Flight 603